The protected grasslands of North America consist of prairies, with a dominant vegetation type of herbaceous plants like grasses, sedges, and other prairie plants, rather than woody vegetation like trees. This  ecosystem was generally dominant within the Interior Plains of central North America but was also present elsewhere. The protected areas include public nature reserves managed by American, Canadian and Mexican wildlife management agencies, Native American tribes and Canadian First Nations, state wildlife management agencies, non-governmental organizations, and private nature reserves.  

Generally speaking, these regions are devoid of trees, except for riparian or gallery forests associated with streams and rivers. The tallgrass prairie, with moderate rainfall and rich soils, were ideally suited to agriculture so it became a productive grain-growing region. Besides agriculture, much of the shortgrass prairie became grazing land for domestic livestock. Short grasslands occur in semi-arid climates while tall grasslands are in areas of higher rainfall. Although much of the grasslands are in the Great Plains ecoregion, protected grasslands can be found in other areas of Canada, Mexico and the United States. Desert (arid) grasslands are composed of sparse grassland ecoregions located in the deserts and xeric shrublands biome. Temperature extremes and low amount of rainfall characterise these kinds of grasslands. Therefore, plants and animals are well adapted to minimize water loss. Shrub-steppe is also a type of low-rainfall natural grassland. While arid, shrub-steppes have sufficient moisture to support a cover of perennial grasses or shrubs, a feature which distinguishes them from deserts. The shrub-steppes of North America occur in the western United States and western Canada, in the rain shadow between the Cascades and Sierra Nevada on the west and the Rocky Mountains on the east. 

The expanses of grass once sustained migrations of an estimated 30 to 60 million American bison which maintained grazing pressure as a keystone species. Once bison could be found across much of North America. While they ranged from the eastern seaboard states to southeast Washington, eastern Oregon, and northeastern California, the greatest numbers were found within the great bison belt on the shortgrass plains east of the Rocky Mountains that stretched from Alberta to Texas. Grazing is important to soil, vegetation and overall ecological balance. The ecosystem was maintained by a pattern of disturbance caused by natural wildfire and grazing by bison, a pattern which is called pyric herbivory. The indigenous peoples of the Plains occupied the land, hunting bison and pronghorn. The expansion of the United States onto the frontier decimated the population of the indigenous people and the bison. 

The plowing of the tallgrass prairie to plant crops destroyed the natural habitat. Less than 4 percent of the prairie is left according to most estimates. Bison occupy less than 1% of their historical range with fewer than 20,000 bison in conservation herds on public, tribal or private protected lands. Roughly 500,000 animals are raised for commercial purposes.

Protected areas

Cemetery prairies
Cemetery prairies are remnants of native North American prairie.

See also 
 Bison herds topics
 
 History of bison conservation in Canada
 U.S. National Grasslands
 Pre-Columbian savannas of North America
 United States Grasslands Reserve Program

References

+
Mexico geography-related lists
Grasslands